Westenburg (or simply Westies), is a pre-urban human settlement (and sub-area) situated in Polokwane under the Capricorn District Municipality in the Limpopo province of South Africa.

References 

 
 
 

Polokwane
Townships in Limpopo
Populated places in the Polokwane Local Municipality